was a private junior college for women located in Chiyoda, Tokyo, Japan. The school closed in March 2011.

History
The school was established in 1903. In 1950, it was one of the first schools to become a girls junior college when the junior college system started in Japan.

Closure
Admission of students ended as of the 2008 school year because of a steady decline in the number of students. As a result, the school closed after the last students graduated in March 2011.

Departments
 Department of Homemaking
 Department of Food Science
 Department of English

External links
 Official website 

Universities and colleges in Tokyo
Japanese junior colleges
Private universities and colleges in Japan
Educational institutions established in 1903
Educational institutions established in 1950
1903 establishments in Japan
1950 establishments in Japan